Stan Leventhal (May 24, 1951 – January 15, 1995) was an American writer and magazine editor. Primarily known as the editor in chief of Heat Publications, a publisher of gay erotic magazines including Mandate, Torso and Inches, he also wrote and published several works of LGBT literature in the 1980s and 1990s. He published three novels and two short story collections during his lifetime; two additional novels were published following his death of AIDS in 1995.

In addition he founded Amethyst Press, a now-defunct publishing company which specialized in LGBT books, including his own books and titles by Dennis Cooper, Bo Huston, Steve Abbott, Kevin Killian, Patrick Moore and Mark Ameen.

He garnered three Lambda Literary Award nominations, in 1989 for Mountain Climbing in Sheridan Square, in 1990 for Fault Lines and in 1991 for Black Marble Pool.

Works

Novels
Mountain Climbing in Sheridan Square (1988)
Fault Lines (1989)
Black Marble Pool (1990)
Skydiving on Christopher Street (1995)
Barbie in Bondage (1996)

Short stories
A Herd of Tiny Elephants (1988)
Candy Holidays and Other Short Fictions (1991)

References

1951 births
1995 deaths
American male novelists
American short story writers
American magazine editors
American book publishers (people)
20th-century American novelists
American LGBT novelists
American gay writers
Writers from New York City
AIDS-related deaths in New York (state)
Jewish American writers
LGBT Jews
American male short story writers
20th-century American male writers
Novelists from New York (state)
20th-century American non-fiction writers
American male non-fiction writers
20th-century American Jews
20th-century American LGBT people